The 2011 African U-23 Championship was the first edition of the football tournament for players under 23 years. It was originally scheduled to be hosted by Egypt from 26 November to 10 December 2011. However, less than two months prior to the start of the tournament, Egyptian authorities decided against hosting the competition because of security concerns. On 13 October 2011, Morocco was chosen as the replacement to host the tournament.

The tournament also doubles up as the qualifiers for the 2012 Summer Olympics. The top 3 placed teams qualified automatically for the 2012 Summer Olympics football tournament, while the 4th best placed team qualify for a play-off with an AFC counterpart.

Qualified teams

The Confederation of African Football chose to create a tournament and qualifying phase to decide which associations could represent Africa at the 2012 Olympic Games. Of CAF's 53 association nations, 39 agreed to participate in the qualifiers for the tournament.

To qualify for the tournament, participating nations had to overcome three two-legged qualifying stages.

Qualified teams:

Venues

Draw
The draw for the tournament was held on 24 September 2011 during the CAF Executive Committee meeting in Cairo, Egypt.

Match officials
The following referees were chosen for the 2012 Africa Cup of Nations.

Squads

Group stage
All times given as local time (UTC)

If two or more teams tied in their points, the following tie-breaker is used:
 Points in the matches between the concerned teams,
 Goal difference in the matches between the concerned teams,
 Number of goals in the matches between the concerned teams,
 Goal difference in all group matches,
 Number of goals in all group matches,
 Fair Play point (number of yellow and red cards),
 Drawing of lots.

Group A

Group B

Knockout stage
All times given as local time (UTC+1)

Semi-finals

Third place play-off

Final

Best eleven
The team of the tournament with substitutes:
 Goalkeeper:  Ahmed El Shenawy
 Defenders:  Mahan Marc Goua,  Moaz El-Henawy,  Remy Ebanega,  Zakarya Bergdich
 Midfielders:  Sameehg Doutie,  Hossam Hassan,  Abdelaziz Barrada,  Raheem Lawal
 Forwards:  Youness Mokhtar,  Abdoulaye Sané
 Subs:  Ousmane Mané (GK);  Ahmed Hegazy and Mohamed Salah,  Allen Nono,  Laglais Xavier Kouassi and Jean Michael Seri,  Soufiane Bidaoui and Adnane Tighadouini,  Danny Uchechi,  Mohamed Chalali

Goalscorers
3 goals
  Abdelaziz Barrada
  Raheem Lawal

2 goals

  Ahmed Shroyda
  Emmanuel Ndong Mba
  Youness Mokhtar
  Danny Uchechi

1 goal

  Mehdi Benaldjia
  Baghdad Bounedjah
  Georges Henri Griffiths
  Moussa Koné
  Lacina Traoré
  Ahmed Magdi
  Marwan Mohsen
  Mohamed Elneny
  Mohamed Salah
  Saleh Gomaa
  Johan Diderot Lengoualama
  Allen Nono
  Landry Obiang Obiang
  André Biyogo Poko
  Lionel Yacouya
  Adnane Tighadouini
  Kara Mbodj
  Abdoulaye Sané
  Omar Wade
  Phumelele Bhengu
  Mandla Masango

Criticisms
Some have questioned the need for the tournament and believe that the CAF-organised Under-23 football tournament, the 2011 All-Africa Games' football tournament should have been used as a qualifying tournament. The increase in number of national U-23 fixtures caused some domestic league schedules to be revised and some league games took place with weakened teams.

There has been criticism from fans towards clubs who have not allowed their players to participate in the qualifying stages as the tournament is not featured on the FIFA Calendar whilst the Olympics tournament is. In effect this means that African nations can call on European-based players for the Olympic tournament who were not able to participate in qualifying due to club commitments.

Qualified for the 2012 Summer Olympics

Inter-continental play-off
  – qualified for an inter-continental play-off against the fourth representative of the Pre-Olympic Tournament in Asian zone

See also
 2012 CAF Women's Pre-Olympic Tournament

References

External links
 CAF U-23 Championship

 
Caf, Men
U-23
2011
Africa
International association football competitions hosted by Morocco
Football at the Summer Olympics – Men's African Qualifiers
2011 in youth association football